Ribbon is a 2017 Indian Hindi-language drama film directed by Rakhee Sandilya in her feature film debut. It stars Kalki Koechlin and Sumeet Vyas in lead roles. The film was released on 3 November 2017.

Plot

Ribbon is the story of Sahana and Karan, a married couple, and the challenges they face when they have to deal with unplanned pregnancy.
Sahana is an executive in a company, the accidental pregnancy set her back from work eventually causing her to lose her job. When she goes on maternity leave she is demoted. Finally when she asks for 3 days leave the office fire her.
Later, it is shown that her daughter is being abused by her bus driver. The plot later revolves around that. The movie also shows light into how working parents struggle with managing life and work.

Cast

 Sumeet Vyas as Karan Mehra
 Kalki Koechlin as Sahana Mehra
 Hitesh Malhan as Sardar
 Baby Kierra Soni as Aashi
 Purnanand Wandekar as Shibu
 Kalyani Mulay as Usha

Production
Filming for the project was completed in June 2017.

Screenings 
Special screening of the movie was arranged in Mumbai on 2 November 2017.

Soundtrack

Reception

Critical response

Pallabi Dey Purkayastha of The Times of India gave the film a rating of 3 star out of 5 and said that, "All in all, Ribbon starts off with one storyline and ends with another, but fails to capture the gamut of both. Rakhee Sandilya has started a conversation on a less-spoken human emotion, very humanely. If only she had taken one route and explored it to its optimum level." Kriti Tulsiani of News 18 gave the film a rating of 3 stars out of 5 saying that, "At a time when Bollywood is journeying away from the usual potboilers, a film like Ribbon is more than welcome. It addresses subjects that Bollywood and even parents sometimes shy away from addressing to their children. So even if the film is a little bland and a little uneven per se, Ribbon makes for a better watch than most of the no-brainers today."

Sweta Kausal of Hindustan Times gave the film a rating of 2.5 stars out of 5 and said that "Ribbon rakes up a lot of issues that deserve at least a discourse in the current scenario, but instead, ends up only fleetingly touching these. Neither the characters nor the narrative take upon the evils and the evil-doers." Shubhra Gupta of The Indian Express gave the film a rating of 2.5 stars out of 5 and said that, "Koechlin leaves a mark as a harried professional, reluctant mom, and a good wife. Vyas is competent too. Some thorny issues are brought up: the troubles that women face at workplaces, the having to outsource child-care, the predators that lurk in the most unexpected places. But as often as the film astutely touches upon the tough choices, and the problems that can crop up, it leaves them, and us, hanging. You are left wanting a little more."

References

External links
 

2017 films
2010s Hindi-language films